Modest Jonathan Mero is a Tanzanian diplomat. He has been Permanent Representative of Tanzania to the United Nations Office at Geneva since 2013.

References

External links

Living people
Ambassadors of Tanzania to the United States
University of Dar es Salaam alumni
Alumni of the University of Strathclyde
Year of birth missing (living people)